Throw a Saddle on a Star is a 1946 American Western film directed by Ray Nazarro and written by J. Benton Cheney. The film stars Ken Curtis, Jeff Donnell, Adele Roberts, Guinn "Big Boy" Williams, Andy Clyde and Frank Sully. The film was released on March 14, 1946, by Columbia Pictures.

Plot

Cast          
Ken Curtis as Curt Walker
Jeff Donnell as Judy Lane
Adele Roberts as Barbara Allen
Guinn "Big Boy" Williams as Big Boy Thompson
Andy Clyde as Pop Walker
Frank Sully as Henry Latimore
The Dinning Sisters as Themselves
Foy Willing as Foy Willing
Paul Trietsch as Hezzie Allen
Gil Taylor as Gil Allen
Ken Trietsch as Ken Allen
Charles Ward as Gabe Allen

References

External links
 

1946 films
1940s English-language films
American Western (genre) films
1946 Western (genre) films
Columbia Pictures films
Films directed by Ray Nazarro
American black-and-white films
1940s American films